Warsaw is a city in Hancock County, Illinois, United States. The population was 1,607 at the 2010 census, a decline from 1,793 in 2000. The city is notable for its historic downtown and the Warsaw Brewery, which operated for more than 100 years beginning in 1861 and, after renovation, reopened as a bar, restaurant and microbrewery in 2006.

History
The city of Warsaw began in 1814, when young Major Zachary Taylor founded Fort Johnson on the eastern bank of the Mississippi River across from the mouth of the Des Moines River. Fort Johnson was occupied only for a few weeks before it was burned. In 1815 another military camp, Fort Edwards, was built nearby at a different location. Warsaw became an important fur trading post and one of the earliest American settlements in northern Illinois.

During the 1840s, Warsaw was a center of opposition to Mormon settlement in Nauvoo and other areas in Hancock County during the conflict sometimes known as the "Mormon Illinois War".  The local newspaper at the time, the Warsaw Signal edited by Thomas C. Sharp, was a vocal opponent of Mormon settlement and practices in western Illinois. The Mormons, led by Willard Richards, attempted to establish a settlement at a site just south of Warsaw during this period, but abandoned these plans due to local opposition and other problems.

The city is notable for its well-preserved downtown with a number of remaining historic businesses. Founded by German immigrants, the Warsaw Brewery opened in 1861 and operated for more than 100 years, ending production in 1971. The facility was renovated and reopened in 2006 as a bar and restaurant.

Geography
Warsaw is located in southwestern Hancock County. It is bordered to the west and northwest by the Mississippi River, which forms the state border with Missouri. The community of Alexandria, Missouri lies due west across the Mississippi, Keokuk, Iowa lies 3.5 miles to the northeast and the city of Hamilton lies approximately six miles to the east-northeast.

Demographics

As of the census of 2000, there were 1,793 people, 726 households, and 500 families residing in the city. The racial makeup of the city was 98.77% White, 0.11% African American, 0.17% Native American, 0.17% Pacific Islander, 0.06% from other races, and 0.73% from two or more races. Hispanic or Latino of any race were 0.89% of the population.

There were 726 households, out of which 32.5% had children under the age of 18 living with them, 58.0% were married couples living together, 8.5% had a female householder with no husband present, and 31.1% were non-families. 27.4% of all households were made up of individuals, and 15.2% had someone living alone who was 65 years of age or older.  The average household size was 2.47 and the average family size was 3.02.

In the city, the population was spread out, with 26.0% under the age of 18, 7.7% from 18 to 24, 25.8% from 25 to 44, 24.8% from 45 to 64, and 15.6% who were 65 years of age or older.  The median age was 39 years. For every 100 females, there were 98.1 males.  For every 100 females age 18 and over, there were 95.3 males.

The median income for a household in the city was $35,000, and the median income for a family was $39,808. Males had a median income of $29,770 versus $20,039 for females. The per capita income for the city was $18,279.  About 6.4% of families and 8.0% of the population were below the poverty line, including 9.9% of those under age 18 and 7.2% of those age 65 or over.

Education
Warsaw Community Unit School District 316 is the community school district. It operates two schools, Warsaw Elementary School and Warsaw High School.

Prior to 2008 Warsaw CUSD 316 operated its own junior high school; as of 2008 students at the junior high level attend Nauvoo-Colusa Junior High School in the Nauvoo-Colusa Community Unit School District 325.

Notable people

 William Harrison Folsom (1815-1901), architect who lived in Warsaw before heading to the California gold fields
 John Milton Hay, statesman, diplomat, journalist, and private secretary to Abraham Lincoln, raised in Warsaw, served as United States Secretary of State (1838-1905)
 Benjamin F. Marsh, congressman, buried in Warsaw

References

External links
City of Warsaw official website

Cities in Hancock County, Illinois
Cities in Illinois
Illinois populated places on the Mississippi River
Populated places established in 1814
1814 establishments in Illinois Territory